The 2013 Women's EuroHockey Championship II was the 5th edition of the Women's EuroHockey Championship II It was held from the 21st until the 28th of July 2013 in Cambrai, France.  The tournament also served as a qualifier for the 2015 EuroHockey Championship with the finalists, Italy and Poland, qualifying.

Qualified teams

Format
The eight teams were split into two groups of four teams. The top two teams advanced to the semifinals to determine the winner in a knockout system. The bottom two teams played in a new group with the teams they did not play against in the group stage. The last two teams were relegated to the EuroHockey Championship III.

Results
All times were local (UTC+2).

Preliminary round

Pool A

Pool B

Classification round

Fifth to eighth place classification
Points obtained in the preliminary round are carried over into Pool C.

Pool C

First to fourth place classification

Semi-finals

Third and fourth place

Final

Final standings

See also
2013 Men's EuroHockey Championship II
2013 Women's EuroHockey Nations Championship

References

Women's EuroHockey Championship II
EuroHockey Championship II
International women's field hockey competitions hosted by France
EuroHockey Championship II Women
Women 2